W. Curtis Thomas is an American former politician who served as a Democratic Party member of the Pennsylvania House of Representatives, District 181.

References

External links
Pennsylvania House of Representatives - Curtis Thomas (Democrat) official PA House website
Pennsylvania House Democratic Caucus - Curtis Thomas official Party website

Living people
Democratic Party members of the Pennsylvania House of Representatives
African-American state legislators in Pennsylvania
1948 births
21st-century American politicians
21st-century African-American politicians
20th-century African-American people